Tomás António Ribeiro Ferreira (1 July 1831 – 6 February 1901), better known as Tomás Ribeiro or Thomaz Ribeiro, was a Portuguese politician, journalist, poet and Ultra-Romantic writer.

He was born in Parada de Gonta, Viseu. After graduating in law at the University of Coimbra, he practised law briefly before turning to a political career. A prominent member of the Partido Regenerador, he was at various times Mayor of Viseu, Deputy, Peer of the Realm, Minister of Maritime Affairs, Minister of Public Works and Civil Governor of the districts of Braga and Porto. He was also secretary general of the government of Portuguese India and ambassador of Portugal in Brazil. Elected a member of the Royal Academy of Sciences, he was president of the Department of Letters. He died in Lisbon and was buried in the Cemitério dos Prazeres.

A versatile writer and journalist, Tomás Ribeiro left a vast body of work. He was the father of the poet Branca de Gonta Colaço and grandfather of the writer Tomás Ribeiro Colaço.

Selected works
D. Jaime ou a dominação de Castela, nationalist poem, 1862
A Delfina do Mal, poetry, 1868
Sons que Passam, poetry, 1868
A Indiana entr'acte in verse, 1873
Vésperas, 1880
Jornadas, travel writing, 1873
1.ª parte - Do Tejo ao Mandovi
2.ª parte - Entre Palmeiras
3.ª parte - Entre Primores
Dissonâncias, 1890
História da Legislação Liberal Portuguesa, essay, 1891-1892
Empréstimo de D. Miguel, essay, 1880
O Mensageiro de Fez, poem in praise of Our Lady of Carnaxide, 1900.

References

External links
 

1831 births
1901 deaths
19th-century Portuguese poets
Portuguese male poets
Romantic poets
Mayors of places in Portugal
Government ministers of Portugal
Legislators in Portugal
People from Viseu District
University of Coimbra alumni
Ambassadors of Portugal to Brazil
19th-century male writers
Naval ministers of Portugal